Wayne O'Gorman is a dual player from County Wicklow, Ireland. He played both Gaelic football and hurling with Wicklow during the 2000s. He was also part of the Wicklow team that won the All-Ireland Junior Football Championship Title in 2002 where he scored 3-02 in the final win over Kerry. He plays his club football with Ashford and hurling with Glenealy with whom he has won County Championship medals.

References

Living people
Dual players
Irish electricians
Wicklow inter-county Gaelic footballers
Wicklow inter-county hurlers
Ashford Gaelic footballers
Glenealy hurlers
Year of birth missing (living people)